Sarah Gabrielle Cabral de Menezes (born March 26, 1990) is a judoka from Brazil. In 2012, she became the first Brazilian woman to win an Olympic gold medal in judo, after defeating the reigning Olympic champion Alina Dumitru. She also competed at the 2008 and 2016 Summer Olympics.

Menezes won her first major medal by claiming bronze at the World Judo Championships in Tokyo in September 2010.

References

External links

 
 
 
 

People from Teresina
1990 births
Judoka at the 2008 Summer Olympics
Judoka at the 2012 Summer Olympics
Judoka at the 2016 Summer Olympics
Olympic judoka of Brazil
Olympic gold medalists for Brazil
Olympic medalists in judo
Living people
Judoka at the 2011 Pan American Games
Medalists at the 2012 Summer Olympics
Brazilian female judoka
Pan American Games bronze medalists for Brazil
Pan American Games medalists in judo
South American Games bronze medalists for Brazil
South American Games medalists in judo
Competitors at the 2006 South American Games
Medalists at the 2011 Pan American Games
Sportspeople from Piauí
20th-century Brazilian women
21st-century Brazilian women